The Twentieth Army Corps was a formation of the Imperial Russian Army that was first raised in 1899, and most famous for fighting on the Eastern Front in World War I, most notably during the Second Battle of the Masurian Lakes. Before World War I, the 20th Corps was stationed in the Vilna Military District with its headquarters in Riga. At the outbreak of the war, the corps consisted of two infantry divisions and a number of independent battalions and brigades. Many Lithuanians served in this unit with the 28th Division having particularly many Lithuanians, especially in the 109th and 111th Infantry Regiments. Some regiments in this Corps were 80% Latvian. The corps was demobilized in April 1917.

Formation 
In 1899, the corps was formed from the 29th and 45th Infantry Divisions. It was under the command of Lieutenant general Richard Troyanovich Meves.

World War I 
During the Second Battle of the Masurian Lakes, the 20th Army Corps was led by General Pavel Illyich Bulgakov. On February 7, in the middle of a snowstorm, Fritz von Below's German Eighth Army launched a surprise attack, advancing  within one week. They inflicted severe casualties on the Imperial Russian Army, resulting in its disorderly withdrawal with many of its soldiers being imprisoned. The greatest loss came when the 20th Army Corps was surrounded by the German Tenth Army in the Augustów Forest. Although many fought their way out, the Corps' remnants surrendered on February 21. A large number of Latvian soldiers were killed, wounded or captured during this battle. This influenced the decision of the Imperial Russian Army to establish the Latvian Riflemen.

Composition
Shortly before the outbreak of World War I, on 1 January 1913, the 20th Army Corps comprised the following units:

At different times during the war, the 20th Corps was part of several different field armies, including the 1st, 2nd, 3rd, 4th, and 10th.

Commanders

The 20th corps was led by the following commanders throughout its existence:

See also
 List of Imperial Russian Army formations and units

Citations

Notes

References
 

Corps of the Russian Empire